The 14th Street/Sixth Avenue station is an underground New York City Subway station complex in the Chelsea district of Manhattan on the IRT Broadway–Seventh Avenue Line, the BMT Canarsie Line and the IND Sixth Avenue Line. It is located on 14th Street between Sixth Avenue (Avenue of the Americas) and Seventh Avenue. It is served by the:

1, 2, F, and L trains at all times
3 train at all times except late nights
M train during weekdays
<F> train during rush hours in the peak direction

A connection is available from this complex to the PATH station at 14th Street and Sixth Avenue. There is a direct passageway from this complex to the PATH station's southbound platform; transferring between this complex and the northbound PATH platform requires exiting onto street level first.

History

Broadway–Seventh Avenue Line 
The Dual Contracts, which were signed on March 19, 1913, were contracts for the construction and/or rehabilitation and operation of rapid transit lines in the City of New York. The contracts were "dual" in that they were signed between the City and two separate private companies (the Interborough Rapid Transit Company and the Brooklyn Rapid Transit Company), all working together to make the construction of the Dual Contracts possible. The Dual Contracts promised the construction of several lines in Brooklyn. As part of Contract 4, the IRT agreed to build a branch of the original subway line south down Seventh Avenue, Varick Street, and West Broadway to serve the West Side of Manhattan.

The construction of this line, in conjunction with the construction of the Lexington Avenue Line, would change the operations of the IRT system. Instead of having trains go via Broadway, turning onto 42nd Street, before finally turning onto Park Avenue, there would be two trunk lines connected by the 42nd Street Shuttle. The system would be changed from looking like a "Z" system on a map to an "H" system. One trunk would run via the new Lexington Avenue Line down Park Avenue, and the other trunk would run via the new Seventh Avenue Line up Broadway. In order for the line to continue down Varick Street and West Broadway, these streets needed to be widened, and two new streets were built, the Seventh Avenue Extension and the Varick Street Extension. It was predicted that the subway extension would lead to the growth of the Lower West Side, and to neighborhoods such as Chelsea and Greenwich Village.

14th Street opened as part of an extension of the line from 34th Street–Penn Station to South Ferry on July 1, 1918. Initially, the station was served by a shuttle running from Times Square to South Ferry. The new "H" system was implemented on August 1, 1918, joining the two halves of the Broadway–Seventh Avenue Line and sending all West Side trains south from Times Square. An immediate result of the switch was the need to transfer using the 42nd Street Shuttle. The completion of the "H" system doubled the capacity of the IRT system.

Canarsie Line 
The Sixth Avenue station on the BMT Canarsie Line opened on June 30, 1924, as the terminal of the 14th Street–Eastern Line, which ran from Sixth Avenue under the East River and through Williamsburg to Montrose and Bushwick Avenues.

Sixth Avenue Line 
The 14th Street station is a local station on the IND Sixth Avenue Line that opened on December 15, 1940, along with the rest of the IND Sixth Avenue Line from West Fourth Street–Washington Square to 47th–50th Streets–Rockefeller Center.

Consolidation as a station complex 

The city government took over the BMT's operations on June 1, 1940, and the IRT's operations on June 12, 1940. On January 16, 1978, a free transfer passageway connecting the 14th Street station on the IRT Broadway-Seventh Avenue Line and the stations on the BMT Canarsie Line and the IND Sixth Avenue Line opened.

The entire station complex except for the PATH station will receive elevators starting in 2022. Originally, the improvements were scheduled for the Sixth Avenue and Canarsie Lines only. , funding had been committed to accessibility renovations at the 14th Street/Sixth Avenue station. A contract for nine elevators at the station complex was awarded in November 2021. Between February 27, 2023, and December 2023, the transfer passageway between Sixth and Seventh Avenues will be closed for the installation of elevators, which would make the station compliant with the Americans with Disabilities Act of 1990. A free out-of-system transfer will be available while the passageway is closed. The work involves constructing seven elevators: two from the IRT platforms to the mezzanine; one from the mezzanine to street level at Seventh Avenue; two from the mezzanine to the BMT platform; and one from either IND platform to both the mezzanine and street level at Sixth Avenue.

Station layout 

The IRT Broadway–Seventh Avenue Line platforms and the other lines' platforms are one block apart.
The express tracks of the IND Sixth Avenue Line run under the complex but are not part of the station.
The PATH platforms are at 14th Street and Sixth Avenue, between the IND Sixth Avenue Line platforms, but require a separate fare payment.

IRT Broadway–Seventh Avenue Line platforms 

The 14th Street station is an express station on the IRT Broadway–Seventh Avenue Line, consisting of four tracks and two island platforms.

The track walls on both sides of the platform have their original IRT mosaic trim line with "14" tablets on it at regular intervals. Both platforms have blue I-beam columns that run along both sides at regular intervals with alternating ones having the standard black station name plate in white lettering.

Exits 
This station has three fare control areas. The full-time entrance is at the north end. A single staircase from each platform leads to a crossover that has a newsstand in the center, two now defunct restrooms above the southbound platforms and tracks (mosaic signs reading "MEN" and "WOMEN" remain intact), and two full height turnstiles above the northbound platform and tracks (one entry/exit and one exit-only) leading to a staircase that goes up to the southeast corner of 14th Street and Seventh Avenue. There is also a passageway leading to the BMT Canarsie platforms on Sixth Avenue, which in turn allows a free transfer to the IND Sixth Avenue Line platforms. The full-time turnstile bank at the center of the crossover opposite the newsstand leads to a mezzanine containing a token booth, three staircases going up to the either northern corners as well as the southwest corner of 14th Street and Seventh Avenue. There is also a now-closed passageway with directional mosaics that leads to 14th Street/Eighth Avenue.

The station has an exit-only area at the center. Two staircases from each platform go up to a crossover where on either side, a single exit-only turnstile and emergency gate leads to a staircase that goes up to either northern corners of 13th Street and Seventh Avenue.

The station has an unstaffed fare control area at the south end. A single staircase from each platform leads to a crossover and a bank of turnstiles as well as one exit-only and one full-height turnstile. The mezzanine has a now-unused customer assistance booth and two staircases going up to both northern corners of 12th Street and Seventh Avenue.

IND Sixth Avenue Line platforms 

The 14th Street station is a local station on the IND Sixth Avenue Line, and has two side platforms to the inside of the tracks. Both platforms have a green trim line on a darker green border and mosaic name tablets reading "14TH STREET" in white sans-serif lettering on a dark green background and a lighter green border. Beneath the trim line and name tablets are small directional and number tile captions in white lettering on a black background. Forest green I-beam columns run along both platforms at regular intervals with alternating ones having the standard black name plate with white lettering.

Trains open their doors to the left in both directions, which is unusual for a side platformed station in New York City. Most side platforms in the system are to the outside of the tracks and thus trains open the doors to the right. In the case of 14th Street, because the platforms of the PATH's Uptown Hudson Tubes already existed along Sixth Avenue, the Sixth Avenue Line platforms flank the existing PATH station.

The Sixth Avenue express tracks used by the B and D are at a lower level beneath the PATH tracks and along with the latter are not visible from the platforms. The deep-bore tunnel's round shape becomes square below this station and at 23rd Street, where provisions for lower-level platforms were built.

There is a full length mezzanine over the platforms and tracks.

Exits 
There are entrance/exits at both 14th Street and 16th Street, with fare controls at both ends. The 14th Street entrance is shared with the PATH station of the same name, which has a separate fare control. At both intersections, exits lead to all four corners. At the extreme south end of each platform, there is a single-wide stairway descending to the Canarsie Line platform.

BMT Canarsie Line platform 

Both track walls have their original mosaic trim line consisting of earthy tones of olive green, brown, ochre and tan augmented by light green and Copenhagen blue. "6" tablets representing "Sixth Avenue" run along the trim line at regular intervals.

The 1993 artwork here is called MTA Jewels by Jennifer Kotter. It consists of paintings of various subjects on the passageway leading to the IRT.

West of the station, a center lay-up track begins at a bumper block and is only accessible from the Eighth Avenue terminal. This station was the terminal for the BMT Canarsie Line until the Eighth Avenue station opened in 1931.

Exits 
The station has seven staircases going up from the platform. The two westernmost ones go up to a passageway that leads to the full-time fare control area at the IRT Broadway–Seventh Avenue Line station. The next two go up to the extreme south ends of either platform of the IND Sixth Avenue Line station. The western staircase goes to the southbound platform, and the one directly east of it goes to the northbound platform

The next two staircases go up to a mezzanine leading to fare control that has a powder blue and state blue trim line. A bank of three regular turnstiles and two high entry/exit turnstiles provide entrance/exit from the station and there is no token booth. Two staircases go up to either eastern corners of 14th Street and Sixth Avenue. Another unstaffed bank of turnstiles by the northeast staircase leads to the mezzanine above the Queens-bound platform of 14th Street on the IND.

The last staircase on the extreme east end of the platform leads to a storage area and ventilation room. Another staircase in this section has been removed.

Image gallery

References

External links 

 
 
 
 Station Reporter — 14th Street/6th and 7th Avenue Complex

IRT Broadway–Seventh Avenue Line stations
Seventh Avenue (Manhattan)
BMT Canarsie Line stations
IND Sixth Avenue Line stations
Sixth Avenue
New York City Subway stations in Manhattan
Railway stations in the United States opened in 1918
1918 establishments in New York City
Railway stations in the United States opened in 1924
Railway stations in the United States opened in 1940
New York City Subway transfer stations
West Village
Chelsea, Manhattan
14th Street (Manhattan)